The Monadnock Region is a region in southwestern New Hampshire. It is named after Mount Monadnock, a 3,165 foot isolated mountain, which is the dominant geographic landmark in the region.  Although it has no specific borders, the Monadnock Region is generally thought of comprising all of Cheshire County and the western portion of Hillsborough County.

In addition to the frequently hiked Mount Monadnock, the region offers abundant opportunities for outdoor recreation, including four New Hampshire state parks. The Monadnock Region also boasts four recreational rail trails, lakes with public swimming beaches, and three ski areas. 

The largest municipality, and only city, in the region is Keene with 23,409 residents. The nearby town of Peterborough is famous for the MacDowell Colony and for being the setting of the Thornton Wilder play Our Town. Other notable landmarks in the region include Cathedral of the Pines and Franklin Pierce College, both located in Rindge.

References

External links
 Guide to Monadnock Region events
 Monadnock Region visitor's guide
 MonadnockRegion.net
 DiscoverMonadnock.com
N.H. Department of Transportation map of New Hampshire's regions

Regions of New Hampshire
Tourism regions of New Hampshire